Digital switchover in the United Kingdom may refer to:

Digital terrestrial television in the United Kingdom#Digital switchover, completed
Digital radio in the United Kingdom#Analogue switch-off, future